Radwaniyah Palace (also known as Al Radwaniyah Presidential Complex) is a palace in Baghdad, Iraq, which functioned as a presidential resort for the late Iraqi president Saddam Hussein until it was taken over by Coalition forces during the 2003 US-led invasion of Iraq. Inside, it was decorated with marble, luxury furniture and monuments dedicated to Saddam. Located near the Baghdad International Airport in western Baghdad, Radwaniyah Palace was the main presidential site for Saddam and was a typical Presidential site. It is bordered on the north by Qasr Tall Mihl and Al Urdun (Jordan) Street; on the south by sparse, outlying neighborhoods and on the east by suburbs Al 'Amiriyah and Hayy al-Furat. High walls surround the former resort; watchtowers contribute to more readily maintaining surveillance and security for the site. It also included a detention facility which according to Human Rights Watch was able to accommodate up to five-thousand inmates. 

In addition to having two man-made hills and several man-made lakes, it houses two presidential palaces. The northern one usually goes by the more familiar name, Al Faw Palace. The southern one is known as the Victory over Iran Palace.

Coalition installations Camp Liberty, Camp Victory and Camp Slayer used to occupy Al Radwaniyah's grounds.

References

Saddam's Palaces: an Interview with Richard Mosse June 2009

Saddam Hussein
Palaces in Iraq
Defunct resorts
Buildings and structures in Baghdad
Official residences in Iraq
Presidential residences

i